Cattleya jenmanii is a species of Cattleya found from Venezuela to Guyana at elevations of 300 – 600 meters

References

External links

jenmanii